The Kassel tramway network is a  network of tramways, forming part of the public transport system in Kassel, a city in the north of the federal state of Hesse, Germany. , the Kassel tram network is made up of seven regular tramlines.

Opened in 1877 as a steam tramway from Wilhelmshöhe the Königsplatz (Royal Square), the network has been operated since 1897 by Kasseler Verkehrs-Gesellschaft (KVG), and is integrated in the Nordhessischer Verkehrsverbund (NVV). There existed also a narrow gauge network to the Hercules monument. The network was extended gradually into the surrounding area, partly as conventional tramways, and partly as a tram-train RegioTram network.

History

In the summer of 1870 a horse-drawn omnibus line opened as part of an industrial exhibition from 1 June to 5 October 1870. 
The growth of the city made it attractive to operate a steam tram which was opened in 1877 by the English company "Jay & Comp. London".  With the first two steam locomotives and four passenger cars they brought visitors to the Royal Palace in Wilhelmshöhe. 
Soon other vehicles, including locomotives made by Henschel, were added to the rolling stock. The Kassel steam train is considered to be the first tramway in Germany not pulled by horses. In 1881 the company was taken over by another company from Berlin which invested in its electrification in 1897.

The "Hercules Rail" was operated separately until 1927 bringing tourists to the Hercules monument.

System

Tram lines 
, the Kassel tram network is made up of seven regular and one additional tramline.

RegioTram 

In addition, Kassel is served by the three lines of the RegioTram system.

Rolling stock

Historic fleet 
Until 1900 54 railcars were ordered at Van Zypen & Charlier and Crede. From 1955 to 1958 the railcar types "260", "261-288 (2 +2 Tw)" designed by Duewag and built in Kassel were put in service. They were in regular service until 1991. Ten vehicles were given to Gorzow in Poland and later scrapped, one of them went to the Warsaw tram friends. Other presented railcars are in two Dutch railway museums one in Hanover and one in Kassel. The next generation 301-317 and 351-366 was produced by Wegmann in Kassel in the 1960s and in service until 2003. Some of them still exist but are not in regular service any more.

Current fleet 
 417-422 (N8C): 16 units produced in 1981 and 6 in 1986 by Duewag - 401-416 sold to ZTM Gdańsk - 417, 419, 422 transported to Gdańzk in 2019 - only 3 operational units remaining in Cassel - 418, 420, 421
 451–475 (NGT6C): 15 units produced from 1990 to 1991 and 10 in 1994 by Duewag
 601–622 (8ENGTW): 22 units delivered by Bombardier from 1999 to 2000 
 631–640 (8ZNGTW): 10 units delivered by Bombardier in 2001 and 2003
 651-672 (NGT8): 22 units delivered by Bombardier from 2011 to 2013

See also
 Kassel RegioTram
 List of town tramway systems in Germany
 Trams in Germany

References

Inline references

Bibliography

External links
 
 Kasseler Verkehrs-Gesellschaft (KVG) - official site
 Track plan of the Kassel tram system
 
 

Kassel
Kassel
Transport in Hesse
Kassel